V. Bruce "Bruce" Jularbal Tolentino, is a Filipino economist, author, professor, and economic policymaker.

Early childhood and education 
Born on June 2, 1953, in Baguio, to father, Toots, a salesman, and mother Florence, who managed the family's photo studio. Bruce graduated from Saint Louis High School and proceeded to the institution's university. There he was editor-in-chief of the SLU White and Blue.

Education 
 University
 Xavier University, B.A. Economics (1978)  
 Mindanao State University, A.B. English Program (1975-1977) 
 Saint Louis University, A.B. Mass Communications Program (1969-1972) 
 Graduate
 Xavier University, M.S. Economics (1979) 
 University of the Philippines, Ph.D. Economics Program (1981-1982) 
 University of Hawaii, Ph.D. Economics (1986)

Career 
Bruce left his boyhood home after the declaration of Martial Law in 1972. Pursued by the martial law military, he escaped to Marawi in Mindanao where he found his interests shifting from communications to economics as he became more and more involved in rural development.

After graduate school at Xavier University in Cagayan de Oro, Mindanao, and University of Hawaii in Honolulu, Bruce returned to the Philippines and began work in the government with a focus on policy-reform processes. He was part of the group that put together the Philippines' membership in the World Trade Organization. He was also on the team that developed the initial draft of the Agri-Agra Reform Law as well as that of the Local Government Code of 1992.

In the 1980s, Bruce was appointed first executive director of the Agricultural Credit Policy Council (ACPC) jointly appointed by former Central Bank Governor Jobo Fernandez and former Agriculture Secretary Ramon Mitra Jr. His function was as lead technical adviser  for a rehabilitation program for all of the rural banks that had been organized, and subsequently failed, during the Masagana 99 era of subsidized loans for rice and corn production.

He served as Assistant Secretary, then Undersecretary of Agriculture (for Policy, Planning, and International Trade) of the Department of Agriculture of the Philippines from 1986 to 1993.

From 2007 to 2012, he served in various positions within The Asia Foundation, including Chief Economist and Country Representative for Sri Lanka, Pakistan, and Afghanistan.

From 2012 to 2018 he served as Deputy Director-General of the International Rice Research Institute, based in Los Baños, Laguna, and also elected Secretary  IRRI Board of Trustees.
As of 2018, Bruce is the newest member of the Monetary Board, the central bank's highest policy-making body.

In 2021, the Agricultural Credit Policy Council launched Enabling Rural and Agricultural Finance for Inclusive Development in the Philippines. Split into three volumes, the book is a collection of Bruce Tolentino's papers, memos, and reports that span four decades of work. It contains "... a record of the challenges, responses, successes as well as failures in rural finance and intermediation" over the course of his career.

Food security 
With more than 35 years of progressive experience in governance, management, analysis, and planning socio-economic development reforms and initiatives, Bruce has been the go-to guy for many agri and food security related projects.

According to Bruce, food security is a regional, even international effort. "Agriculture—which produces food—cannot be confined to the artificial borders of countries. Food is a product of human ingenuity applied to natural resources—land, water, sunlight, rainfall—that also spill across borders. Some countries, especially the large countries like the US, China, India, have more than enough food. Many other, smaller countries—such as Singapore, Malaysia, Korea—are largely dependent on food produced by others. With worsening climate change and resource degradation, as populations continue to grow, open international trade and global cooperation is becoming even more imperative to ensure that all populations of all nations share in the bounty of the earth as a whole."

Personal life 
Bruce is married to Rory Francisco-Tolentino, former director of Philippine Business for Social Progress and Ayala Foundation and current consultant for various nonprofit management projects. He has two children, Josh Tolentino and Ma. Amanda Tolentino-Santos.

References

External links 

Bruce Tolentino personal site
Economics alumnus helps guide monetary policies for the Philippines
Enabling Rural and Agricultural Finance for Inclusive Development in the Philippines eBook

20th-century Filipino economists
1953 births
People from Baguio
Living people
Saint Louis University (Philippines) alumni
University of the Philippines alumni
University of Hawaiʻi alumni
Mindanao State University alumni
21st-century Filipino economists